Schizocypris is a genus of cyprinid fish found in southern and south-western Asia.

Species
There are currently three recognized species in this genus:
 Schizocypris altidorsalis Bianco & Bănărescu, 1982
 Schizocypris brucei Regan, 1914 (Waziristan snowtrout)
 Schizocypris ladigesi M. S. Karaman (sr), 1969

References

Cyprinidae genera
Cyprinid fish of Asia